Uranium-238 (238U or U-238) is the most common isotope of uranium found in nature, with a relative abundance of 99%. Unlike uranium-235, it is non-fissile, which means it cannot sustain a chain reaction in a thermal-neutron reactor. However, it is fissionable by fast neutrons, and is fertile, meaning it can be transmuted to fissile plutonium-239. 238U cannot support a chain reaction because inelastic scattering reduces neutron energy below the range where fast fission of one or more next-generation nuclei is probable. Doppler broadening of 238U's neutron absorption resonances, increasing absorption as fuel temperature increases, is also an essential negative feedback mechanism for reactor control.

Around 99.284% of natural uranium's mass is uranium-238, which has a half-life of 1.41 seconds (4.468 years, or 4.468 billion years).
Due to its natural abundance and half-life relative to other radioactive elements, 238U produces ~40% of the radioactive heat produced within the Earth. The decay of 238U to daughter isotopes is extensively used in radiometric dating, particularly for material older than ~ 1 million years.

Depleted uranium has an even higher concentration of the 238U isotope, and even low-enriched uranium (LEU), while having a higher proportion of the uranium-235 isotope (in comparison to depleted uranium), is still mostly 238U. Reprocessed uranium is also mainly 238U, with about as much uranium-235 as natural uranium, a comparable proportion of uranium-236, and much smaller amounts of other isotopes of uranium such as uranium-234, uranium-233, and uranium-232.

Nuclear energy applications
In a fission nuclear reactor, uranium-238 can be used to generate plutonium-239, which itself can be used in a nuclear weapon or as a nuclear-reactor fuel supply. In a typical nuclear reactor, up to one-third of the generated power comes from the fission of 239Pu, which is not supplied as a fuel to the reactor, but rather, produced from 238U. The latter usually involves used "recycled" MOX fuel which entered the reactor containing significant amounts of plutonium.

Breeder reactors
238U can produce energy via "fast" fission. In this process, a neutron that has a kinetic energy in excess of 1 MeV can cause the nucleus of 238U to split. Depending on design, this process can contribute some one to ten percent of all fission reactions in a reactor, but too few of the average 2.5 neutrons produced in each fission have enough speed to continue a chain reaction.

238U can be used as a source material for creating plutonium-239, which can in turn be used as nuclear fuel. Breeder reactors carry out such a process of transmutation to convert the fertile isotope 238U into fissile 239Pu. It has been estimated that there is anywhere from 10,000 to five billion years worth of 238U for use in these power plants. Breeder technology has been used in several experimental nuclear reactors.

By December 2005, the only breeder reactor producing power was the 600-megawatt BN-600 reactor at the Beloyarsk Nuclear Power Station in Russia. Russia later built another unit, BN-800, at the Beloyarsk Nuclear Power Station which became fully operational in November 2016. Also, Japan's Monju breeder reactor, which has been inoperative for most of the time since it was originally built in 1986, was ordered for decommissioning in 2016, after safety and design hazards were uncovered, with a completion date set for 2047. Both China and India have announced plans to build nuclear breeder reactors.

The breeder reactor as its name implies creates even larger quantities of 239Pu or 233U than the fission nuclear reactor.

The Clean And Environmentally Safe Advanced Reactor (CAESAR), a nuclear reactor concept that would use steam as a moderator to control delayed neutrons, will potentially be able to use 238U as fuel once the reactor is started with Low-enriched uranium (LEU) fuel. This design is still in the early stages of development.

CANDU reactors
Natural uranium, with 0.7% , is usable as nuclear fuel in reactors designed specifically to make use of naturally occurring uranium, such as CANDU reactors. By making use of non-enriched uranium, such reactor designs give a nation access to nuclear power for the purpose of electricity production without necessitating the development of fuel enrichment capabilities, which are often seen as a prelude to weapons production.

Radiation shielding
238U is also used as a radiation shield – its alpha radiation is easily stopped by the non-radioactive casing of the shielding and the uranium's high atomic weight and high number of electrons are highly effective in absorbing gamma rays and X-rays. It is not as effective as ordinary water for stopping fast neutrons. Both metallic depleted uranium and depleted uranium dioxide are used for radiation shielding. Uranium is about five times better as a gamma ray shield than lead, so a shield with the same effectiveness can be packed into a thinner layer.

DUCRETE, a concrete made with uranium dioxide aggregate instead of gravel, is being investigated as a material for dry cask storage systems to store radioactive waste.

Downblending
The opposite of enriching is downblending. Surplus highly enriched uranium can be downblended with depleted uranium or natural uranium to turn it into low-enriched uranium suitable for use in commercial nuclear fuel.

238U from depleted uranium and natural uranium is also used with recycled 239Pu from nuclear weapons stockpiles for making mixed oxide fuel (MOX), which is now being redirected to become fuel for nuclear reactors. This dilution, also called downblending, means that any nation or group that acquired the finished fuel would have to repeat the very expensive and complex chemical separation of uranium and plutonium process before assembling a weapon.

Nuclear weapons

Most modern nuclear weapons utilize 238U as a "tamper" material (see nuclear weapon design). A tamper which surrounds a fissile core works to reflect neutrons and to add inertia to the compression of the 239Pu charge. As such, it increases the efficiency of the weapon and reduces the critical mass required. In the case of a thermonuclear weapon, 238U
can be used to encase the fusion fuel, the high flux of very energetic neutrons from the resulting fusion reaction causes 238U nuclei to split and adds more energy to the "yield" of the weapon. Such weapons are referred to as fission-fusion-fission weapons after the order in which each reaction takes place. An example of such a weapon is Castle Bravo.

The larger portion of the total explosive yield in this design comes from the final fission stage fueled by 238U, producing enormous amounts of radioactive fission products. For example, an estimated 77% of the 10.4-megaton yield of the Ivy Mike thermonuclear test in 1952 came from fast fission of the depleted uranium tamper. Because depleted uranium has no critical mass, it can be added to thermonuclear bombs in almost unlimited quantity. The Soviet Union's test of the Tsar Bomba in 1961 produced "only" 50 megatons of explosive power, over 90% of which came from fusion because the 238U final stage had been replaced with lead. Had 238U been used instead, the yield of the Tsar Bomba could have been well above 100 megatons, and it would have produced nuclear fallout equivalent to one third of the global total that had been produced up to that time.

Radium series (or uranium series) 
The decay chain of 238U is commonly called the "radium series" (sometimes "uranium series"). Beginning with naturally occurring uranium-238, this series includes the following elements: astatine, bismuth, lead, polonium, protactinium, radium, radon, thallium, and thorium. All of the decay products are present, at least transiently, in any uranium-containing sample, whether metal, compound, or mineral. The decay proceeds as:

The mean lifetime of 238U is 1.41 seconds divided by 0.693 (or multiplied by 1.443), i.e. ca. 2 seconds, so 1 mole of 238U emits 3 alpha particles per second, producing the same number of thorium-234 atoms. In a closed system an equilibrium would be reached, with all amounts except for lead-206 and 238U in fixed ratios, in slowly decreasing amounts. The amount of 206Pb will increase accordingly while that of 238U decreases; all steps in the decay chain have this same rate of 3 decayed particles per second per mole 238U.

Thorium-234 has a mean lifetime of 3 seconds, so there is equilibrium if one mole of 238U contains 9 atoms of thorium-234, which is 1.5 mole (the ratio of the two half-lives). Similarly, in an equilibrium in a closed system the amount of each decay product, except the end product lead, is proportional to its half-life.

While 238U is minimally radioactive, its decay products, thorium-234 and protactinium-234, are beta particle emitters with half-lives of about 20 days and one minute respectively. Protactinium-234 decays to uranium-234, which has a half-life of hundreds of millennia, and this isotope does not reach an equilibrium concentration for a very long time. When the two first isotopes in the decay chain reach their relatively small equilibrium concentrations, a sample of initially pure 238U will emit three times the radiation due to 238U itself, and most of this radiation is beta particles.

As already touched upon above, when starting with pure 238U, within a human timescale the equilibrium applies for the first three steps in the decay chain only. Thus, for one mole of 238U, 3 times per second one alpha and two beta particles and a gamma ray are produced, together 6.7 MeV, a rate of 3 µW. Extrapolated over 2 seconds this is 600 gigajoules, the total energy released in the first three steps in the decay chain.

Radioactive dating
238U abundance and its decay to daughter isotopes comprises multiple uranium dating techniques and is one of the most common radioactive isotopes used in radiometric dating. The most common dating method is uranium-lead dating, which is used to date rocks older than 1 million years old and has provided ages for the oldest rocks on Earth at 4.4 billion years old.

The relation between 238U and 234U gives an indication of the age of sediments and seawater that are between 100,000 years and 1,200,000 years in age.

The 238U daughter product, 206Pb, is an integral part of lead–lead dating, which is most famous for the determination of the age of the Earth.

The Voyager program spacecraft carry small amounts of initially pure 238U on the covers of their golden records to facilitate dating in the same manner.

Health concerns 
Uranium emits alpha particles through the process of alpha decay. External exposure has limited effect. Significant internal exposure to tiny particles of uranium or its decay products, such as thorium-230, radium-226 and radon-222 can cause severe health effects, such as cancer of the bone or liver.

Uranium is also a toxic chemical, meaning that ingestion of uranium can cause kidney damage from its chemical properties much sooner than its radioactive properties would cause cancers of the bone or liver.

See also
 Depleted uranium
 Uranium-lead dating

References

External links
 NLM Hazardous Substances Databank – Uranium, Radioactive

Actinides
Fertile materials
Isotopes of uranium
Uranium
Radionuclides used in radiometric dating